Lambert van Noort (1520–1571) was a Flemish Renaissance painter.

Biography
Lambert was born in Amersfoort. According to Houbraken he was an important painter and architect who became the father of the painter Adam van Noort. In 1547 he became a member of the Antwerp Guild of St. Luke. Houbraken took his information from Karel van Mander, who called him Lambrecht van Oort.

According to the RKD, van Noort was a painter in oils as well as a draughtsman of stained glass window designs. He died in Antwerp.

References

Lambert van Noort on Artnet

1520 births
1571 deaths
Flemish Renaissance painters
People from Amersfoort
Painters from Antwerp